USS Pollux or USNS Pollux has been the name of more than one United States Navy ship, and may refer to:

 , a cargo ship in commission from 3 to 24 April 1918
 , a general stores issue ship commissioned in 1941 and wrecked in 1942
 , a general stores issue ship in commission from April 1942 to April 1950 and from August 1950 to December 1968
 , ex-T-AK-290, a vehicle cargo ship in non-commissioned service from 1981 to 2007

United States Navy ship names